≈Myrtle Whitemore was a New York based politician and former Commissioner of the New York City Housing Authority.

Appointments
In 1996,  Whitmore was appointed as a board member of the New York City Housing Authority by Rudolph W. Giuliani.

Recognition
Whitmore was recognized in 2017 by the Society of Old Brooklynites.  Here she also served as s director.

Media Apprearences
Whitmore appeared on the Charlie Rose show called "NOT IN MY BACKYARD, PT. 1".
She appeared on C Span for the Annual Black Republican forum 
She served as  fill in for Bob Grant (radio host).

References

 

21st-century American politicians
21st-century American women politicians
Commissioners in New York City
People from Park Slope
Politicians from Brooklyn
Public housing in New York City
New York (state) Republicans